Pramudya Kusumawardana Riyanto (born 13 December 2000) is an Indonesian badminton player from Sukabumi, who affiliate with Djarum club. He was part of the Indonesian junior team that won the bronze medals at the 2018 Asian and World Junior Championships, and also the boys' doubles bronze in the 2018 Asian Junior Championships.

Career

Early years 

Kusumawardana is a member of Djarum badminton club. In the National event, he won the boys' doubles junior title at the 2016 North Sumatera and Surabaya Opens and also the mixed doubles cadet title at the 2017 East Java Open. He then selected to join the Indonesia junior team competed at the 2018 Asian Junior Championships, and winning the bronze medals in the boys' doubles and mixed team events, later clinched the mixed team bronze at the 2018 World Junior Championships. Teamed-up with Ribka Sugiarto in the mixed doubles, he won a Junior Grand Prix title in the India Junior International tournament. He also finished runners-up at the Finnish Open with Rehan Naufal Kusharjanto.

In 2019, Kusumawardana reached the final of the International Challenge tournament in Iran with Yeremia Rambitan, but was defeated to their compatriots Adnan Maulana and Ghifari Anandaffa Prihardika in straight game. In March, they lost in the second round of 2019 Orléans Masters from Chinese Taipei pair. In July, they lost in the second round of Russian Open from Russian pair Vladimir Ivanov and Ivan Sozonov. In August, they participated in Hyderabad Open in India but lost in the first round. In September, they lost in the second round of Vietnam Open.

In 2020, Kusumawardana who competed with Yeremia Rambitan lost in the first round of 2020 Spain Masters.

2021 

In January, Kusumawardana and Rambitan participated in Thailand tour and lost in the first round of 2020 Yonex Thailand Open, and in the second round of the next tour 2020 Toyota Thailand Open from the same pair of Mohammad Ahsan and Hendra Setiawan. In March European tour, they lost in the second round of Swiss Open, but took their first tournament victory as a combination in the 2021 Spain Masters, beating fellow Indonesian pair Sabar Karyaman Gutama and Muhammad Reza Pahlevi Isfahani.

In October, they reached the second round of 2021 Denmark Open and won the Belgian International beating Muhammad Shohibul Fikri and Bagas Maulana in the final. In November, they lost in the semi-finals of 2021 Hylo Open from fellow Indonesian Leo Rolly Carnando and Daniel Marthin. They participated in the Indonesia Badminton Festival in Bali and reach the quarter-finals of 2021 Indonesia Masters from fellow Indonesian Marcus Fernaldi Gideon and Kevin Sanjaya Sukamuljo. In the next tour, they lost in the second round of 2021 Indonesia Open. They qualified for 2021 BWF World Tour Finals but only managed to book one win and eliminated in group stage.

2022 
In February, Kusumawardana and Rambitan participated in Badminton Asia Team Championships with Indonesia and lost the title to Malaysia. In March, they participated in European tour and lost in the first round of All England Open, and reach the semi-finals of Swiss Open. In April, they lost in second round of Korea Open from teammate Muhammad Shohibul Fikri and Bagas Maulana, and the first round of Korea Masters.

In May, they won the Badminton Asia Championships gold medal in the men's doubles discipline after defeating Malaysian pair Aaron Chia and Soh Wooi Yik, ending Indonesia's 13-year wait for a men's doubles gold medal at the championships. In latter May, he won a silver medal in the men's doubles with Rambitan and a bronze medal in the men's team at the Southeast Asian Games. In June, they lost in second round of Indonesia Masters from teammate Fajar Alfian and Muhammad Rian Ardianto. In the next tour, they lost in the quarter-final of Indonesia Open in which Rambitan get injured when they just needed one point.

In October, Kusumawardana made a temporary partnership with his junior Rahmat Hidayat following the injury of Rambitan at the Malang Indonesia International. They managed to win the title at the first tournament together by defeating Japanese pair Hiroki Okamura and Masayuki Onodera. They won the second title in a row at the Indonesia Masters Super 100 by defeating 1st seed Chinese pair He Jiting and Zhou Haodong.

2023 
Kusumawardana and Rambitan opened the 2023 season at the Malaysia Open, but defeated in the second round to fellow Indonesian pair Mohammad Ahsan and Hendra Setiawan. They competed at the home tournament, Indonesia Masters, but had to lose in the first round from fellow Indonesian pair 1st seeds Fajar Alfian and Muhammad Rian Ardianto. In the next tournament, they lost in the quarter-finals of the Thailand Masters from Chinese Taipei pair Su Ching-heng and Ye Hong-wei.

In February, Kusumawardana join the Indonesia national badminton team to compete at the Badminton Asia Mixed Team Championships, but unfortunately the teams lost in the quarter-finals from team Korea.

Achievements

Asian Championships 
Men's doubles

Southeast Asian Games 
Men's doubles

Asian Junior Championships 
Boys' doubles

BWF World Tour (2 titles) 
The BWF World Tour, which was announced on 19 March 2017 and implemented in 2018, is a series of elite badminton tournaments sanctioned by the Badminton World Federation (BWF). The BWF World Tours are divided into levels of World Tour Finals, Super 1000, Super 750, Super 500, Super 300 (part of the HSBC World Tour), and the BWF Tour Super 100.

Men's doubles

BWF International Challenge/Series (2 titles, 2 runners-up) 
Men's doubles

  BWF International Challenge tournament
  BWF International Series tournament

BWF Junior International (1 title, 3 runners-up) 
Boys' doubles

Mixed doubles

  BWF Junior International Grand Prix tournament
  BWF Junior International Challenge tournament
  BWF Junior International Series tournament
  BWF Junior Future Series tournament

Performance timeline

National team 
 Junior level

 Senior level

Individual competitions

Junior level 
Boys' doubles

Mixed doubles

Senior level

Men's doubles

Mixed doubles

References

External links 
 

2000 births
Living people
People from Sukabumi
Sportspeople from West Java
Indonesian male badminton players
Competitors at the 2021 Southeast Asian Games
Southeast Asian Games bronze medalists for Indonesia
Southeast Asian Games medalists in badminton
21st-century Indonesian people